is a railway station in  Ōizumi-Nishiide in the city of Hokuto, Yamanashi Prefecture, Japan.

Lines
Kai-Ōizumi Station is served by the Koumi Line and is 12.2 kilometers from the terminus of the line at Kobuchizawa Station.

Station layout
The station consists of two ground-level opposed side platforms, connected by a level crossing.  The station has a Midori no Madoguchi staffed ticket office.

Platforms

History
Kai-Ōizumi Station was opened on 27 July 1933 by the Japanese Government Railways. With the privatization of Japanese National Railways (JNR) on 1 April 1987, the station came under the control of JR East.

Passenger statistics
In fiscal 2015, the station was used by an average of 74 passengers daily (boarding passengers only).

Surrounding area
 Ōizumi Post Office
 Ōizumi Onsen

See also
List of railway stations in Japan

References

External links

Kai-Ōizumi Station (JR East)

Railway stations in Yamanashi Prefecture
Stations of East Japan Railway Company
Railway stations in Japan opened in 1933
Koumi Line
Hokuto, Yamanashi